

Mac 
 Joseph Macaluso b. 1931 first elected in 1963 as Liberal member for Hamilton West, Ontario.
 Lawrence MacAulay b. 1946 first elected in 1988 as Liberal member for Cardigan, Prince Edward Island.
 Arthur Allister MacBain b. 1925 first elected in 1980 as Liberal member for Niagara Falls, Ontario.
 William Burton MacDiarmid b. 1875   first elected in 1940 as Liberal member for Glengarry, Ontario.
 Albert Frederick Macdonald b. 1901   first elected in 1949 as Liberal member for Edmonton East, Alberta.
 Alexander Barrett Macdonald b. 1918   first elected in 1957 as Cooperative Commonwealth Federation member for Vancouver Kingsway, British Columbia.
 Alexander Francis Macdonald b. 1818 first elected in 1874 as Liberal member for Cornwall, Ontario.
 Angus Lewis Macdonald b. 1890   first elected in 1940 as Liberal member for Kingston City, Ontario.
 Angus Ronald Macdonald b. 1901   first elected in 1957 as Progressive Conservative member for Antigonish—Guysborough, Nova Scotia.
 Archibald John Macdonald b. 1876   first elected in 1925 as Liberal member for Glengarry, Ontario.
 Augustine Colin Macdonald b. 1837 first elected in 1873 as Liberal-Conservative member for King's County, Prince Edward Island.
 Daniel Joseph MacDonald b. 1918   first elected in 1972 as Liberal member for Cardigan, Prince Edward Island.
 David MacDonald b. 1936   first elected in 1965 as Progressive Conservative member for Prince, Prince Edward Island.
 Donald Alexander Macdonald b. 1817 first elected in 1867 as Liberal member for Glengarry, Ontario.
 Donald Stovel Macdonald b. 1932   first elected in 1962 as Liberal member for Rosedale, Ontario.
 Edward Mortimer Macdonald b. 1865 first elected in 1904 as Liberal member for Pictou, Nova Scotia.
 Finlay MacDonald b. 1866 first elected in 1925 as Conservative member for Cape Breton South, Nova Scotia.
 Flora Isabel MacDonald b. 1926   first elected in 1972 as Progressive Conservative member for Kingston and the Islands, Ontario.
 Heath MacDonald b. 1966 first elected in 2021 as Liberal member for Malpeque, Prince Edward Island. 
 Hugh John Macdonald b. 1850 first elected in 1891 as Liberal-Conservative member for Winnipeg, Manitoba.
 John Macdonald (Canadian politician) b. 1824 first elected in 1875 as Independent Liberal member for Toronto Centre, Ontario.
 John Alexander Macdonald (Prince Edward Island politician) b. 1874 first elected in 1925 as Conservative member for King's, Prince Edward Island.
 John Alexander Macdonald (Nova Scotia politician) b. 1883   first elected in 1925 as Conservative member for Richmond—West Cape Breton, Nova Scotia.
 John Alexander Macdonald b. 1815 first elected in 1867 as Liberal-Conservative member for Kingston, Ontario.
 John Augustine Macdonald b. 1913   first elected in 1957 as Progressive Conservative member for King's, Prince Edward Island.
 John Sandfield Macdonald b. 1812 first elected in 1867 as Liberal member for Cornwall, Ontario.
 Margaret Mary Macdonald b. 1910   first elected in 1961 as Progressive Conservative member for King's, Prince Edward Island.
 Peter Macdonald b. 1835 first elected in 1887 as Liberal member for Huron East, Ontario.
 Ronald MacDonald b. 1955 first elected in 1988 as Liberal member for Dartmouth, Nova Scotia.
 Wilbur MacDonald b. 1933   first elected in 1979 as Progressive Conservative member for Cardigan, Prince Edward Island.
 William Chisholm Macdonald b. 1889   first elected in 1940 as Liberal member for Halifax, Nova Scotia.
 William Ross Macdonald b. 1891   first elected in 1935 as Liberal member for Brantford City, Ontario.
 Angus Claude Macdonell b. 1861 first elected in 1904 as Conservative member for Toronto South, Ontario.
 Donald Greenfield MacDonell b. 1849 first elected in 1880 as Liberal member for Lanark North, Ontario.
 George Hugh Macdonell b. 1851 first elected in 1891 as Conservative member for Algoma, Ontario.
 John Alexander MacDonell b. 1854 first elected in 1896 as Liberal member for Selkirk, Manitoba.
 James MacKerras Macdonnell b. 1884   first elected in 1945 as Progressive Conservative member for Muskoka—Ontario, Ontario.
 Colin MacDougall b. 1834 first elected in 1874 as Liberal member for Elgin East, Ontario.
 Isaac Duncan MacDougall b. 1897   first elected in 1925 as Conservative member for Inverness, Nova Scotia.
 John Alexander Frances MacDougall b. 1947   first elected in 1982 as Progressive Conservative member for Timiskaming, Ontario.
 John Lorne MacDougall b. 1898   first elected in 1949 as Liberal member for Vancouver—Burrard, British Columbia.
 Day Hort MacDowall b. 1850 first elected in 1887 as Conservative member for Provisional District of Saskatchewan, Northwest Territories.
 Allan MacEachen b. 1921   first elected in 1953 as Liberal member for Inverness—Richmond, Nova Scotia.
 Howard Russell Macewan b. 1925   first elected in 1957 as Progressive Conservative member for Pictou, Nova Scotia.
 Angus MacFarlane b. 1925   first elected in 1974 as Liberal member for Hamilton Mountain, Ontario.
 Robert MacFarlane b. 1835 first elected in 1867 as Liberal member for Perth South, Ontario.
 Alistair MacGregor first elected in 2015 as New Democratic Party member for Cowichan—Malahat—Langford, British Columbia. 
 Mark R. MacGuigan b. 1931   first elected in 1968 as Liberal member for Windsor—Walkerville, Ontario.
 Angus MacInnis b. 1884   first elected in 1930 as Independent Labour member for Vancouver South, British Columbia.
 Donald MacInnis b. 1918   first elected in 1957 as Progressive Conservative member for Cape Breton South, Nova Scotia.
 Malcolm MacInnis b. 1933   first elected in 1962 as New Democratic Party member for Cape Breton South, Nova Scotia.
 Grace MacInnis b. 1905   first elected in 1965 as New Democratic Party member for Vancouver Kingsway, British Columbia.
 Bryce Mackasey b. 1921   first elected in 1962 as Liberal member for Verdun, Quebec.
 Elmer MacKay b. 1936   first elected in 1971 as Progressive Conservative member for Central Nova, Nova Scotia.
 Newton LeGayet Mackay b. 1832 first elected in 1872 as Conservative member for Cape Breton, Nova Scotia.
 Peter MacKay b. 1965   first elected in 1997 as Progressive Conservative member for Pictou—Antigonish—Guysborough, Nova Scotia.
 David MacKeen b. 1839 first elected in 1887 as Conservative member for Cape Breton, Nova Scotia.
 John Armstrong MacKelvie b. 1865 first elected in 1920 as Conservative member for Yale, British Columbia.
 Alexander Mackenzie b. 1822 first elected in 1867 as Liberal member for Lambton, Ontario.
 Dave MacKenzie b. 1947   first elected in 2004 as Conservative member for Oxford, Ontario.
 Frederick Mackenzie b. 1841 first elected in 1874 as Liberal member for Montreal West, Quebec.
 Frederick Donald MacKenzie b. 1882   first elected in 1935 as Liberal member for Neepawa, Manitoba.
 Hugh Alexander MacKenzie b. 1882   first elected in 1935 as Liberal member for Lambton—Kent, Ontario.
 Ian Alistair Mackenzie b. 1890   first elected in 1930 as Liberal member for Vancouver Centre, British Columbia.
 Henry Arthur Mackie b. 1878   first elected in 1917 as Unionist member for Edmonton East, Alberta.
 Herbert John Mackie b. 1876   first elected in 1917 as Unionist member for Renfrew North, Ontario.
 Thomas Mackie b. 1840 first elected in 1896 as Liberal member for Renfrew North, Ontario.
 Donald Alexander MacKinnon b. 1863 first elected in 1900 as Liberal member for East Queen's, Prince Edward Island.
 George Ernest Lawson MacKinnon b. 1879   first elected in 1940 as National Government member for Kootenay East, British Columbia.
 James Angus MacKinnon b. 1881   first elected in 1935 as Liberal member for Edmonton West, Alberta.
 Steven MacKinnon b. 1966 first elected in 2015 as Liberal member for Gatineau, Quebec.
 Charles Herbert Mackintosh b. 1843 first elected in 1882 as Conservative member for City of Ottawa, Ontario.
 Paul Macklin b. 1944   first elected in 2000 as Liberal member for Northumberland, Ontario.
 Alexander Ferguson MacLaren b. 1854 first elected in 1896 as Conservative member for Perth North, Ontario.
 Murray MacLaren b. 1861 first elected in 1921 as Conservative member for St. John—Albert, New Brunswick.
 Roy MacLaren b. 1934   first elected in 1979 as Liberal member for Etobicoke North, Ontario.
 William Scott MacLaren b. 1845 first elected in 1900 as Liberal member for Huntingdon, Quebec.
 Alexander Kenneth Maclean b. 1869 first elected in 1904 as Liberal member for Lunenburg, Nova Scotia.
 Alfred Edgar MacLean b. 1868 first elected in 1921 as Liberal member for Prince, Prince Edward Island.
 John Angus MacLean b. 1914   first elected in 1951 as Progressive Conservative member for Queen's, Prince Edward Island.
 John Douglas Campbell MacLean b. 1929   first elected in 1958 as Progressive Conservative member for Winnipeg North Centre, Manitoba.
 Matthew MacLean b. 1879   first elected in 1937 as Liberal member for Cape Breton North and Victoria, Nova Scotia.
 William Findlay Maclean b. 1854 first elected in 1892 as Conservative member for York East, Ontario.
 Robert Simpson MacLellan b. 1925   first elected in 1958 as Progressive Conservative member for Inverness—Richmond, Nova Scotia.
 Russell MacLellan b. 1940   first elected in 1979 as Liberal member for Cape Breton—The Sydneys, Nova Scotia.
 Donald MacLennan b. 1877   first elected in 1935 as Liberal member for Inverness—Richmond, Nova Scotia.
 James Maclennan b. 1833 first elected in 1874 as Liberal member for Victoria North, Ontario.
 Donald Macmaster b. 1846 first elected in 1882 as Conservative member for Glengarry, Ontario.
 Cyrus Macmillan b. 1882   first elected in 1940 as Liberal member for Queen's, Prince Edward Island.
 Duncan Macmillan b. 1837 first elected in 1875 as Liberal-Conservative member for Middlesex East, Ontario.
 Frank MacMillan b. 1882   first elected in 1930 as Conservative member for Saskatoon, Saskatchewan.
 John Angus MacMillan b. 1889   first elected in 1933 as Liberal member for Mackenzie, Saskatchewan.
 John Watson MacNaught b. 1904   first elected in 1945 as Liberal member for Prince, Prince Edward Island.
 Alan Aylesworth Macnaughton b. 1903   first elected in 1949 as Liberal member for Mount Royal, Quebec.
 Charles Grant MacNeil b. 1892   first elected in 1935 as Cooperative Commonwealth Federation member for Vancouver North, British Columbia.
 John Ritchie MacNicol b. 1878   first elected in 1930 as Conservative member for Toronto Northwest, Ontario.
 George Taylor MacNutt b. 1865 first elected in 1925 as Conservative member for Colchester, Nova Scotia.
 Thomas MacNutt b. 1850 first elected in 1908 as Liberal member for Saltcoats, Saskatchewan.
 Agnes Macphail b. 1890   first elected in 1921 as Progressive member for Grey Southeast, Ontario.
 Robert George Macpherson b. 1866 first elected in 1903 as Liberal member for Burrard, British Columbia.
 Thomas Henry Macpherson b. 1842 first elected in 1896 as Liberal member for Hamilton, Ontario.
 Heath MacQuarrie b. 1919 first elected in 1957 as Progressive Conservative member for Queen's, Prince Edward Island.
 John Chester MacRae b. 1912 first elected in 1957 as Progressive Conservative member for York—Sunbury, New Brunswick.
 John David MacRae b. 1876   first elected in 1935 as Liberal member for Glengarry, Ontario.
 Lyle MacWilliam b. 1949   first elected in 1988 as New Democratic Party member for Okanagan—Shuswap, British Columbia.

Mad–Maz 

 James William Maddin b. 1874 first elected in 1908 as Liberal-Conservative member for Cape Breton South, Nova Scotia.
 Frank Madill b. 1852 first elected in 1887 as Conservative member for Ontario North, Ontario.
 John Ellwood Madill b. 1915   first elected in 1963 as Progressive Conservative member for Dufferin—Simcoe, Ontario.
 Joseph Alexandre Camille Madore b. 1858 first elected in 1896 as Liberal member for Hochelaga, Quebec.
 Charles Magill b. 1816 first elected in 1867 as Liberal member for Hamilton, Ontario.
 Charles Alexander Magrath b. 1860 first elected in 1908 as Conservative member for Medicine Hat, Alberta.
 Larry Maguire b. 1949 first elected in 2013 as Conservative member for Brandon—Souris, Manitoba. 
 John Archibald Maharg b. 1872 first elected in 1917 as Unionist member for Maple Creek, Saskatchewan.
 Shirley Maheu b. 1931   first elected in 1988 as Liberal member for Saint-Laurent, Quebec.
 Pat Mahoney b. 1929   first elected in 1968 as Liberal member for Calgary South, Alberta.
 Steve Mahoney b. 1947   first elected in 1997 as Liberal member for Mississauga West, Ontario.
 Hoang Mai b. 1973 first elected in 2011 as New Democratic Party member for Brossard—La Prairie, Quebec. 
 Élie Mailloux b. 1830 first elected in 1872 as Conservative member for Témiscouata, Quebec.
 Claudy Mailly b. 1938   first elected in 1984 as Progressive Conservative member for Gatineau, Quebec.
 Francis William Maine b. 1937   first elected in 1974 as Liberal member for Wellington, Ontario.
 Charles Beautrom Major b. 1851 first elected in 1907 as Liberal member for Labelle, Quebec.
 Robert Benoit Major b. 1915   first elected in 1968 as Liberal member for Argenteuil, Quebec.
 William Joseph Major b. 1896   first elected in 1949 as Liberal member for Glengarry, Ontario.
 James Malcolm b. 1880   first elected in 1921 as Liberal member for Bruce North, Ontario.
 Sheila Malcolmson b. 1966 first elected in 2015 as New Democratic Party member for Nanaimo—Ladysmith, British Columbia.
 Jean-Claude Malépart b. 1938   first elected in 1979 as Liberal member for Sainte-Marie, Quebec.
 Gurbax Singh Malhi b. 1949   first elected in 1993 as Liberal member for Bramalea—Gore—Malton, Ontario.
 Joseph Léon Vital Mallette b. 1888   first elected in 1935 as Liberal member for Jacques Cartier, Quebec.
 Albert Elhanon Mallory b. 1848 first elected in 1887 as Liberal member for Northumberland East, Ontario.
 Luc Malo b. 1973 first elected in 2006 as Bloc Québécois member for Verchères—Les Patriotes, Quebec.
 Arnold John Malone b. 1937   first elected in 1974 as Progressive Conservative member for Battle River, Alberta.
 Arthur Edward Martin Maloney b. 1919   first elected in 1957 as Progressive Conservative member for Parkdale, Ontario.
 James Maloney first elected in 2015 as Liberal member for Etobicoke—Lakeshore, Ontario.
 John Maloney b. 1945   first elected in 1993 as Liberal member for Erie, Ontario.
 John William Maloney b. 1884   first elected in 1945 as Liberal member for Northumberland, New Brunswick.
 Martin James Maloney b. 1877   first elected in 1925 as Conservative member for Renfrew South, Ontario.
 Arthur Cyrille Albert Malouin b. 1857 first elected in 1898 as Liberal member for Quebec-Centre, Quebec.
 Jacques Malouin b. 1826 first elected in 1877 as Independent member for Quebec-Centre, Quebec.
 Jim Maloway b. 1952 first elected in 2008 as New Democratic member for Elmwood—Transcona, Manitoba.
 André Maltais b. 1948   first elected in 1979 as Liberal member for Manicouagan, Quebec.
 Auguste Maltais b. 1916   first elected in 1949 as Liberal member for Charlevoix, Quebec.
 Lauréat Maltais b. 1923   first elected in 1962 as Social Credit member for Saguenay, Quebec.
 Peter Mancini b. 1956   first elected in 1997 as New Democratic Party member for Sydney—Victoria, Nova Scotia.
 Nick Mandziuk b. 1902   first elected in 1957 as Progressive Conservative member for Marquette, Manitoba.
 Henry Philip Mang b. 1897   first elected in 1953 as Liberal member for Qu'Appelle, Saskatchewan.
 Robert James Manion b. 1881   first elected in 1917 as Unionist member for Fort William and Rainy River, Ontario.
 John Manley b. 1950   first elected in 1988 as Liberal member for Ottawa South, Ontario.
 James Douglas Manly b. 1932   first elected in 1980 as New Democratic Party member for Cowichan—Malahat—The Islands, British Columbia.
 Paul Manly b. 1964 first elected in 2019 as Green member for Nanaimo—Ladysmith, British Columbia. 
 Fabian Manning b. 1964 first elected in 2006 as Conservative member for Avalon, Newfoundland and Labrador
 Preston Manning b. 1942   first elected in 1993 as Reform member for Calgary Southwest, Alberta.
 Park Manross b. 1895   first elected in 1945 as Progressive Conservative member for London, Ontario.
 David Ames Manson b. 1841 first elected in 1880 as Liberal-Conservative member for Brome, Quebec.
 Moe Mantha b. 1933   first elected in 1984 as Progressive Conservative member for Nipissing, Ontario.
 John Andrew Mara b. 1840 first elected in 1887 as Conservative member for Yale, British Columbia.
 Gilles Marceau b. 1928   first elected in 1968 as Liberal member for Lapointe, Quebec.
 Richard Marceau b. 1970 first elected in 1997 as Bloc Québécois member for Charlesbourg, Quebec.
 Jean Marchand b. 1918   first elected in 1965 as Liberal member for Quebec West, Quebec.
 Jean-Paul Marchand b. 1944   first elected in 1993 as Bloc Québécois member for Québec-Est, Quebec.
 Leonard Marchand b. 1933   first elected in 1968 as Liberal member for Kamloops—Cariboo, British Columbia.
 Sergio Marchi b. 1956   first elected in 1984 as Liberal member for York West, Ontario.
 Charles Marcil b. 1860 first elected in 1900 as Liberal member for Bonaventure, Quebec.
 Serge Marcil b. 1944   first elected in 2000 as Liberal member for Beauharnois—Salaberry, Quebec.
 Simon Marcil first elected in 2015 as Bloc Québécois member for Mirabel, Quebec.
 Joseph Edmond Marcile b. 1854 first elected in 1898 as Liberal member for Bagot, Quebec.
 François Arthur Marcotte b. 1866 first elected in 1896 as Conservative member for Champlain, Quebec.
 Guy Marcoux b. 1924   first elected in 1962 as Social Credit member for Québec—Montmorency, Quebec.
 Elphège Marier b. 1888   first elected in 1939 as Liberal member for Jacques Cartier, Quebec.
 Charles-Eugène Marin b. 1925   first elected in 1984 as Progressive Conservative member for Gaspé, Quebec.
 Inky Mark b. 1947   first elected in 1997 as Reform member for Dauphin—Swan River, Manitoba.
 Diane Marleau b. 1943   first elected in 1988 as Liberal member for Sudbury, Ontario.
 George Carlyle Marler b. 1901   first elected in 1954 as Liberal member for Saint-Antoine—Westmount, Quebec.
 Herbert Meredith Marler b. 1876   first elected in 1921 as Liberal member for St. Lawrence—St. George, Quebec.
 Eugène Marquis b. 1901   first elected in 1945 as Liberal member for Kamouraska, Quebec.
 John Allmond Marsh b. 1894   first elected in 1937 as Conservative member for Hamilton West, Ontario.
 David Marshall b. 1846 first elected in 1906 as Conservative member for Elgin East, Ontario.
 Jack Marshall b. 1919   first elected in 1968 as Progressive Conservative member for Humber—St. George's—St. Barbe, Newfoundland and Labrador.
 James Alexander Marshall b. 1888   first elected in 1935 as Social Credit member for Camrose, Alberta.
 Joseph Henry Marshall b. 1854 first elected in 1887 as Conservative member for Middlesex East, Ontario.
 Wayne Marston b. 1947 first elected in 2006 as New Democratic Party member for Hamilton East—Stoney Creek, Ontario.
 Jean-Jacques Martel b. 1927   first elected in 1958 as Progressive Conservative member for Chapleau, Quebec.
 Lewis Herbert Martell b. 1885   first elected in 1921 as Liberal member for Hants, Nova Scotia.
 Richard Martel b. 1961 first elected in 2018 as Conservative member for Chicoutimi—Le Fjord, Quebec.
 Alan Gray Martin b. 1930   first elected in 1974 as Liberal member for Scarborough West, Ontario.
 Alexander Martin b. 1842 first elected in 1896 as Conservative member for East Queen's, Prince Edward Island.
 Alexander Munro Martin b. 1852 first elected in 1907 as Liberal member for Wellington North, Ontario.
 Joseph Martin b. 1852 first elected in 1893 as Liberal member for Winnipeg, Manitoba.
 Keith Martin b. 1960   first elected in 1993 as Reform member for Esquimalt—Juan de Fuca, British Columbia.
 Médéric Martin b. 1869 first elected in 1906 as Liberal member for St. Mary, Quebec.
 Murdo Martin b. 1917   first elected in 1957 as Cooperative Commonwealth Federation member for Timmins, Ontario.
 Pat Martin b. 1955   first elected in 1997 as New Democratic Party member for Winnipeg Centre, Manitoba.
 Paul Martin b. 1938   first elected in 1988 as Liberal member for LaSalle—Émard, Quebec.
 Paul Martin Sr. b. 1903   first elected in 1935 as Liberal member for Essex East, Ontario.
 Peter Francis Martin b. 1856 first elected in 1917 as Unionist member for Halifax, Nova Scotia.
 Shirley Martin b. 1932   first elected in 1984 as Progressive Conservative member for Lincoln, Ontario.
 Thomas Martin b. 1850 first elected in 1904 as Liberal member for Wellington North, Ontario.
 Tony Martin b. 1948   first elected in 2004 as New Democratic Party member for Sault Ste. Marie, Ontario.
 William Melville Martin b. 1876   first elected in 1908 as Liberal member for Regina, Saskatchewan.
 Paul Raymond Martineau b. 1921   first elected in 1958 as Progressive Conservative member for Pontiac—Témiscamingue, Quebec.
 Pierre-Raymond-Léonard Martineau b. 1857 first elected in 1898 as Liberal member for Montmagny, Quebec.
 Soraya Martinez Ferrada first elected in 2015 as Liberal member for Hochelaga, Quebec.
 Quinto Martini b. 1908   first elected in 1957 as Progressive Conservative member for Hamilton East, Ontario.
 Peter Masniuk b. 1920   first elected in 1972 as Progressive Conservative member for Portage, Manitoba.
 Arthur Massé b. 1894   first elected in 1949 as Independent Liberal member for Kamouraska, Quebec.
 Brian Masse b. 1968   first elected in 2002 as New Democratic Party member for Windsor West, Ontario.
 Marcel Masse b. 1936   first elected in 1984 as Progressive Conservative member for Frontenac, Quebec.
 Marcel Massé b. 1940   first elected in 1993 as Liberal member for Hull—Aylmer, Quebec.
 Paul-André Massé b. 1941   first elected in 1979 as Liberal member for Saint-Jean, Quebec.
 Rémi Massé first elected in 2015 as Liberal member for Avignon—La Mitis—Matane—Matapédia, Quebec.
 Denton Massey b. 1900   first elected in 1935 as Conservative member for Greenwood, Ontario.
 James Masson b. 1847 first elected in 1887 as Conservative member for Grey North, Ontario.
 Louis-François-Rodrigue Masson b. 1833 first elected in 1867 as Conservative member for Terrebonne, Quebec.
 Luc Hyacinthe Masson b. 1811 first elected in 1867 as Conservative member for Soulanges, Quebec.
 Joseph-Aimé Massue b. 1860 first elected in 1887 as Conservative member for Richelieu, Quebec.
 Louis Huet Massue b. 1828 first elected in 1878 as Liberal-Conservative member for Richelieu, Quebec.
 Jack Masters b. 1931   first elected in 1980 as Liberal member for Thunder Bay—Nipigon, Ontario.
 Barry Mather b. 1909   first elected in 1962 as New Democratic Party member for New Westminster, British Columbia.
 John Ross Matheson b. 1917   first elected in 1961 as Liberal member for Leeds, Ontario.
 Joseph Matheson b. 1833 first elected in 1900 as Liberal member for Richmond, Nova Scotia.
 Neil Alexander Matheson b. 1904   first elected in 1953 as Liberal member for Queen's, Prince Edward Island.
 Michel Mathieu b. 1838 first elected in 1872 as Conservative member for Richelieu, Quebec.
 Irene Mathyssen b. 1951 first elected in 2006 as New Democratic Party member for London—Fanshawe, Ontario. 
 Lindsay Mathyssen first elected in 2019 as New Democratic Party member for London—Fanshawe, Ontario.
 Jean-Paul Matte b. 1914   first elected in 1962 as Liberal member for Champlain, Quebec.
 René Matte b. 1935   first elected in 1968 as Ralliement Créditiste member for Champlain, Quebec.
 Bill Matthews b. 1947   first elected in 1997 as Progressive Conservative member for Burin—St. George's, Newfoundland and Labrador.
 James Ewen Matthews b. 1869 first elected in 1938 as Liberal member for Brandon, Manitoba.
 James Herbert Matthews b. 1883   first elected in 1945 as Cooperative Commonwealth Federation member for Kootenay East, British Columbia.
 Robert Charles Matthews b. 1871 first elected in 1926 as Conservative member for Toronto East Centre, Ontario.
 Walter Franklyn Matthews b. 1900   first elected in 1958 as Progressive Conservative member for Nanaimo, British Columbia.
 George Ritchie Maxwell b. 1857 first elected in 1896 as Liberal member for Burrard, British Columbia.
 Bryan May b. 1974 first elected in 2015 as Liberal member for Cambridge, Ontario.
 Elizabeth May b. 1954 first elected in 2011 as Green member for Saanich—Gulf Islands, British Columbia. 
 Ralph Maybank b. 1890   first elected in 1935 as Liberal member for Winnipeg South Centre, Manitoba.
 Milton Edgar Maybee b. 1872 first elected in 1921 as Conservative member for Northumberland, Ontario.
 Charles James Mayer b. 1936   first elected in 1979 as Progressive Conservative member for Portage—Marquette, Manitoba.
 Colin Mayes b. 1948 first elected in 2006 as Conservative member for Okanagan—Shuswap, British Columbia. 
 Philip Mayfield b. 1937   first elected in 1993 as Reform member for Cariboo—Chilcotin, British Columbia.
 Robert Wellington Mayhew b. 1880   first elected in 1937 as Liberal member for Victoria, British Columbia.
 Hormidas Mayrand b. 1858 first elected in 1903 as Liberal member for Maskinongé, Quebec.
 Don Mazankowski b. 1935   first elected in 1968 as Progressive Conservative member for Vegreville, Alberta.
 Dan Mazier first elected in 2019 as Conservative member for Dauphin—Swan River—Neepawa, Manitoba.

Mc 

 John McAdam b. 1807 first elected in 1872 as Liberal-Conservative member for Charlotte, New Brunswick.
 Duncan Hamilton McAlister b. 1872 first elected in 1908 as Liberal member for King's and Albert, New Brunswick.
 John McAlister b. 1842 first elected in 1891 as Liberal-Conservative member for Restigouche, New Brunswick.
 Allan Getchell McAvity b. 1882   first elected in 1938 as Liberal member for St. John—Albert, New Brunswick.
 James Alexander McBain b. 1910   first elected in 1954 as Progressive Conservative member for Elgin, Ontario.
 Murray Arndell McBride b. 1935   first elected in 1968 as Liberal member for Lanark and Renfrew, Ontario.
 Thomas George McBride b. 1867 first elected in 1921 as Progressive member for Cariboo, British Columbia.
 Fred Alward McCain b. 1917   first elected in 1972 as Progressive Conservative member for Carleton—Charlotte, New Brunswick.
 Alexander McCall b. 1844 first elected in 1908 as Conservative member for Norfolk, Ontario.
 Angus Neil McCallum b. 1892   first elected in 1937 as Liberal member for Frontenac—Addington, Ontario.
 John McCallum b. 1950   first elected in 2000 as Liberal member for Markham, Ontario.
 Lachlan McCallum b. 1823 first elected in 1867 as Liberal-Conservative member for Monck, Ontario.
 James Joseph McCann b. 1887   first elected in 1935 as Liberal member for Renfrew South, Ontario.
 D'Alton McCarthy b. 1836 first elected in 1876 as Conservative member for Cardwell, Ontario.
 Leighton Goldie McCarthy b. 1869 first elected in 1898 as Independent member for Simcoe North, Ontario.
 Maitland Stewart McCarthy b. 1872 first elected in 1904 as Conservative member for Calgary, Northwest Territories.
 Thomas McCarthy b. 1832 first elected in 1867 as Conservative member for Richelieu, Quebec.
 Gary Francis McCauley b. 1940   first elected in 1979 as Liberal member for Moncton, New Brunswick.
 Kelly McCauley b. 1964 first elected in 2015 as Conservative member for Edmonton West, Alberta. 
 William McCleary b. 1853 first elected in 1896 as Conservative member for Welland, Ontario.
 Robert Jardine McCleave b. 1922   first elected in 1957 as Progressive Conservative member for Halifax, Nova Scotia.
 Ian McClelland b. 1942   first elected in 1993 as Reform member for Edmonton Southwest, Alberta.
 Stewart McClenaghan b. 1867 first elected in 1925 as Conservative member for City of Ottawa, Ontario.
 Firman McClure b. 1861 first elected in 1897 as Liberal member for Colchester, Nova Scotia.
 Archibald Blake McCoig b. 1873 first elected in 1908 as Liberal member for Kent West, Ontario.
 John B. McColl b. 1861 first elected in 1900 as Liberal member for Northumberland West, Ontario.
Phil McColeman b. 1954 first elected in 2008 as Conservative member for Brant, Ontario. 
 Thomas Henry McConica b. 1855 first elected in 1921 as Progressive member for Battleford, Saskatchewan.
 Thomas David McConkey b. 1815 first elected in 1867 as Liberal member for Simcoe North, Ontario.
 Lewis Arthur McConville b. 1849 first elected in 1880 as Conservative member for Joliette, Quebec.
 Charles Arthur McCool b. 1853 first elected in 1900 as Liberal member for Nipissing, Ontario.
 George McCormick b. 1856 first elected in 1896 as Liberal-Conservative member for Muskoka and Parry Sound, Ontario.
 Larry McCormick b. 1940   first elected in 1993 as Liberal member for Hastings—Frontenac—Lennox and Addington, Ontario.
 George Ewan McCraney b. 1868 first elected in 1906 as Liberal member for Saskatchewan, Saskatchewan.
 William McCraney b. 1831 first elected in 1875 as Liberal member for Halton, Ontario.
 Francis McCrea b. 1852 first elected in 1911 as Liberal member for Town of Sherbrooke, Quebec.
 William Forsythe McCreary b. 1855 first elected in 1900 as Liberal member for Selkirk, Manitoba.
 Peter L. McCreath b. 1943   first elected in 1988 as Progressive Conservative member for South Shore, Nova Scotia.
 Karen McCrimmon b. 1959 first elected in 2015 as Liberal member for Kanata—Carleton, Ontario.
 William Paul Joseph McCrossan b. 1942   first elected in 1978 as Progressive Conservative member for York—Scarborough, Ontario.
 Duncan Fletcher McCuaig b. 1889   first elected in 1935 as Liberal member for Simcoe North, Ontario.
 Duncan John McCuaig b. 1882   first elected in 1945 as Cooperative Commonwealth Federation member for Maple Creek, Saskatchewan.
 James Simeon McCuaig b. 1819 first elected in 1878 as Conservative member for Prince Edward, Ontario.
 Robert McCubbin b. 1902   first elected in 1940 as Liberal member for Middlesex West, Ontario.
 Robert Lorne McCuish b. 1923   first elected in 1979 as Progressive Conservative member for Prince George—Bulkley Valley, British Columbia.
 William Armstrong McCulla b. 1837 first elected in 1887 as Conservative member for Peel, Ontario.
 Henry Byron McCulloch b. 1877   first elected in 1935 as Liberal member for Pictou, Nova Scotia.
 Edward George McCullough b. 1909   first elected in 1945 as Cooperative Commonwealth Federation member for Assiniboia, Saskatchewan.
 Fleming Blanchard McCurdy b. 1875   first elected in 1911 as Conservative member for Shelburne and Queen's, Nova Scotia.
 Howard McCurdy b. 1932   first elected in 1984 as New Democratic Party member for Windsor—Walkerville, Ontario.
 Emmett Andrew McCusker b. 1889   first elected in 1949 as Liberal member for Regina City, Saskatchewan.
 Maclyn McCutcheon b. 1912   first elected in 1963 as Progressive Conservative member for Lambton—Kent, Ontario.
 George Manning McDade b. 1893   first elected in 1930 as Conservative member for Northumberland, New Brunswick.
 Sydney Smith McDermand b. 1868 first elected in 1920 as United Farmers of Ontario member for Elgin East, Ontario.
 John Horton McDermid b. 1940   first elected in 1979 as Progressive Conservative member for Brampton—Georgetown, Ontario.
 John Stewart McDiarmid b. 1882   first elected in 1926 as Liberal member for Winnipeg South, Manitoba.
 Angus McDonald b. 1867 first elected in 1920 as Independent member for Timiskaming, Ontario.
 Angus Peter McDonald b. 1813 first elected in 1867 as Conservative member for Middlesex West, Ontario.
 Charles McDonald b. 1867 first elected in 1925 as Liberal member for Prince Albert, Saskatchewan.
 Duncan McDonald b. 1839 first elected in 1878 as Liberal member for Victoria, Nova Scotia.
 Edmund Mortimer McDonald b. 1825 first elected in 1867 as Anti-Confederate member for Lunenburg, Nova Scotia.
 George William McDonald b. 1875   first elected in 1935 as Liberal-Progressive member for Souris, Manitoba.
 Hugh McDonald b. 1827 first elected in 1867 as Anti-Confederate member for Antigonish, Nova Scotia.
 James McDonald b. 1828 first elected in 1872 as Conservative member for Pictou, Nova Scotia.
 John Archibald McDonald b. 1851 first elected in 1887 as Conservative member for Victoria, Nova Scotia.
 Ken McDonald b. 1959 first elected in 2015 as Liberal member for Avalon, Newfoundland and Labrador. 
 Lynn McDonald b. 1940   first elected in 1982 as New Democratic Party member for Broadview—Greenwood, Ontario.
 Robert Matthew Turnbull McDonald b. 1931   first elected in 1957 as Progressive Conservative member for Hamilton South, Ontario.
 Wallace Reginald McDonald b. 1876   first elected in 1935 as Liberal member for Pontiac, Quebec.
 Wilfred Kennedy "Bucko" McDonald b. 1911   first elected in 1945 as Liberal member for Parry Sound, Ontario.
 William McDonald b. 1837 first elected in 1872 as Conservative member for Cape Breton, Nova Scotia.
 William Walter McDonald b. 1844 first elected in 1892 as Conservative member for Assiniboia East, Northwest Territories.
 Samuel McDonnell b. 1834 first elected in 1872 as Conservative member for Inverness, Nova Scotia.
 Alexa McDonough b. 1944   first elected in 1997 as New Democratic Party member for Halifax, Nova Scotia.
 John McDougald b. 1848 first elected in 1881 as Liberal-Conservative member for Pictou, Nova Scotia.
 Barbara McDougall b. 1937   first elected in 1984 as Progressive Conservative member for St. Paul's, Ontario.
 Hector Francis McDougall b. 1848 first elected in 1884 as Liberal-Conservative member for Cape Breton, Nova Scotia.
 John Lorn McDougall b. 1838 first elected in 1869 as Liberal member for Renfrew South, Ontario.
 William McDougall b. 1831 first elected in 1868 as Conservative member for Three Rivers, Quebec.
 William McDougall b. 1822 first elected in 1867 as Liberal-Conservative member for Lanark North, Ontario.
 George McEwen b. 1849 first elected in 1900 as Liberal member for Huron South, Ontario.
 Murray Lincoln McFarlane b. 1908   first elected in 1958 as Progressive Conservative member for Kootenay East, British Columbia.
 Moses Elijah McGarry b. 1878   first elected in 1940 as Liberal member for Inverness—Richmond, Nova Scotia.
 Frank Charles McGee b. 1926   first elected in 1957 as Progressive Conservative member for York—Scarborough, Ontario.
 Thomas D'Arcy McGee b. 1825 first elected in 1867 as Liberal-Conservative member for Montreal West, Quebec.
 Gerald Grattan McGeer b. 1888   first elected in 1935 as Liberal member for Vancouver—Burrard, British Columbia.
 James Wright McGibbon b. 1901   first elected in 1940 as Liberal member for Argenteuil, Quebec.
 Peter McGibbon b. 1873 first elected in 1917 as Unionist member for Muskoka, Ontario.
 Peter Robert McGibbon b. 1854 first elected in 1917 as Laurier Liberal member for Argenteuil, Quebec.
 Angus McGillis b. 1874 first elected in 1930 as Conservative member for Glengarry, Ontario.
 John Alexander McGillivray b. 1853 first elected in 1895 as Liberal-Conservative member for Ontario North, Ontario.
 Harold Buchanan McGiverin b. 1870 first elected in 1908 as Liberal member for City of Ottawa, Ontario.
 John McGowan b. 1845 first elected in 1900 as Liberal-Conservative member for Wellington Centre, Ontario.
 James Aloysius McGrath b. 1932   first elected in 1957 as Progressive Conservative member for St. John's East, Newfoundland and Labrador.
 Thomas McGreevy b. 1825 first elected in 1867 as Liberal-Conservative member for Quebec West, Quebec.
 Alexander McGregor b. 1864 first elected in 1917 as Unionist member for Pictou, Nova Scotia.
 Robert Henry McGregor b. 1886   first elected in 1926 as Conservative member for York South, Ontario.
 William McGregor b. 1836 first elected in 1874 as Liberal member for Essex, Ontario.
 Malcolm McGugan b. 1846 first elected in 1896 as Liberal member for Middlesex South, Ontario.
 David J. McGuinty b. 1960   first elected in 2004 as Liberal member for Ottawa South, Ontario.
 Joseph Blair McGuire b. 1944   first elected in 1988 as Liberal member for Egmont, Prince Edward Island.
 George McHugh b. 1845 first elected in 1896 as Liberal member for Victoria South, Ontario.
 George James McIlraith b. 1908   first elected in 1940 as Liberal member for Ottawa West, Ontario.
 George Valentine McInerney b. 1857 first elected in 1892 as Liberal-Conservative member for Kent, New Brunswick.
 Stewart Donald McInnes b. 1937   first elected in 1984 as Progressive Conservative member for Halifax, Nova Scotia.
 Thomas Robert McInnes b. 1840 first elected in 1878 as Independent member for New Westminster, British Columbia.
 William Wallace Burns McInnes b. 1871 first elected in 1896 as Liberal member for Vancouver, British Columbia.
 Cameron Ross McIntosh b. 1871 first elected in 1925 as Liberal member for North Battleford, Saskatchewan.
 John McIntosh b. 1841 first elected in 1900 as Conservative member for Town of Sherbrooke, Quebec.
 John McIntosh b. 1909   first elected in 1958 as Progressive Conservative member for Swift Current—Maple Creek, Saskatchewan.
 John Charles McIntosh b. 1874 first elected in 1917 as Unionist member for Nanaimo, British Columbia.
 Gilbert Howard McIntyre b. 1852 first elected in 1904 as Liberal member for Perth South, Ontario.
 Peter Adolphus McIntyre b. 1840 first elected in 1874 as Liberal member for King's County, Prince Edward Island.
 Wilbert McIntyre b. 1867 first elected in 1906 as Liberal member for Strathcona, Alberta.
 Angus McIsaac b. 1842 first elected in 1873 as Liberal member for Antigonish, Nova Scotia.
 Colin Francis McIsaac b. 1854 first elected in 1895 as Liberal member for Antigonish, Nova Scotia.
 James McIsaac b. 1854 first elected in 1917 as Unionist member for King's, Prince Edward Island.
 Joseph Clifford McIsaac b. 1930 first elected in 1974 as Liberal member for Battleford—Kindersley, Saskatchewan.
 Daniel McIvor b. 1873 first elected in 1935 as Liberal member for Fort William, Ontario.
 Alexander McKay b. 1843 first elected in 1887 as Conservative member for Hamilton, Ontario.
 Angus McKay b. 1836 first elected in 1871 as Conservative member for Marquette, Manitoba.
 Eric Bowness McKay b. 1899   first elected in 1945 as Cooperative Commonwealth Federation member for Weyburn, Saskatchewan.
 James McKay b. 1862 first elected in 1911 as Conservative member for Prince Albert, Saskatchewan.
 John McKay b. 1948 first elected in 1997 as Liberal member for Scarborough East, Ontario.
 Matthew McKay b. 1858 first elected in 1921 as Liberal member for Renfrew North, Ontario.
 Thomas McKay b. 1839 first elected in 1874 as Liberal-Conservative member for Colchester, Nova Scotia.
 James Charles McKeagney b. 1815 first elected in 1867 as Anti-Confederate member for Cape Breton, Nova Scotia.
 Catherine McKenna b. 1971 first elected in 2015 as Liberal member for Ottawa Centre, Ontario.
 A. Daniel McKenzie b. 1924   first elected in 1972 as Progressive Conservative member for Winnipeg South Centre, Manitoba.
 Daniel Duncan McKenzie b. 1859 first elected in 1904 as Liberal member for North Cape Breton and Victoria, Nova Scotia.
 Peter H. McKenzie b. 1845 first elected in 1904 as Liberal member for Bruce South, Ontario.
 Robert McKenzie b. 1875   first elected in 1925 as Liberal member for Assiniboia, Saskatchewan.
 Hugh Cummings McKillop b. 1872 first elected in 1921 as Conservative member for Elgin West, Ontario.
 Robert Elgin McKinley b. 1928   first elected in 1965 as Progressive Conservative member for Huron, Ontario.
 Allan McKinnon b. 1917   first elected in 1972 as Progressive Conservative member for Victoria, British Columbia.
 Glen McKinnon b. 1937   first elected in 1993 as Liberal member for Brandon—Souris, Manitoba.
 Hugh Bathgate McKinnon b. 1885   first elected in 1934 as Liberal member for Kenora—Rainy River, Ontario.
 Ron McKinnon b. 1951 first elected in 2015 as Liberal member for Coquitlam—Port Coquitlam, British Columbia.
 William Hunter McKnight b. 1940   first elected in 1979 as Progressive Conservative member for Kindersley—Lloydminster, Saskatchewan.
 Daniel McLachlin b. 1810 first elected in 1867 as Liberal member for Renfrew South, Ontario.
 Norman Alexander McLarty b. 1889   first elected in 1935 as Liberal member for Essex West, Ontario.
 Audrey McLaughlin b. 1936   first elected in 1987 as New Democratic Party member for Yukon, Yukon.
 Allan M.A. McLean b. 1891   first elected in 1962 as Liberal member for Charlotte, New Brunswick.
 Andrew Young McLean b. 1909   first elected in 1949 as Liberal member for Huron—Perth, Ontario.
 Angus Alexander McLean b. 1854 first elected in 1904 as Conservative member for Queen's, Prince Edward Island.
 George Alexander McLean b. 1885   first elected in 1935 as Liberal member for Simcoe East, Ontario.
 Greg McLean first elected in 2019 as Conservative member for Calgary Centre, Alberta. 
 Hugh Havelock McLean b. 1854 first elected in 1908 as Liberal member for Sunbury—Queen's, New Brunswick.
 John McLean b. 1846 first elected in 1891 as Conservative member for King's County, Prince Edward Island.
 Malcolm McLean b. 1883   first elected in 1925 as Liberal member for Melfort, Saskatchewan.
 Michael Dalton McLean first elected in 1930 as Conservative member for Kootenay East, British Columbia.
 Murdo Young McLean b. 1848 first elected in 1908 as Liberal member for Huron South, Ontario.
 Peter Douglas McLean b. 1856 first elected in 1907 as Liberal member for York Centre, Ontario.
 Walter Franklin McLean b. 1936   first elected in 1979 as Progressive Conservative member for Waterloo, Ontario.
 Archibald McLelan b. 1824 first elected in 1867 as Anti-Confederate member for Colchester, Nova Scotia.
 Anne McLellan b. 1950   first elected in 1993 as Liberal member for Edmonton Northwest, Alberta.
 Bernard Donald McLellan b. 1859 first elected in 1898 as Liberal member for West Prince, Prince Edward Island.
 Ronald David McLelland b. 1926   first elected in 1965 as Progressive Conservative member for Rosetown—Biggar, Saskatchewan.
 Angus MacLennan b. 1844 first elected in 1896 as Liberal member for Inverness, Nova Scotia.
 John McLennan b. 1821 first elected in 1878 as Liberal-Conservative member for Glengarry, Ontario.
 Roderick R. McLennan b. 1842 first elected in 1891 as Conservative member for Glengarry, Ontario.
 William Alexander McLennan b. 1903   first elected in 1958 as Progressive Conservative member for New Westminster, British Columbia.
 Angus McLeod b. 1857 first elected in 1900 as Liberal-Conservative member for Ontario North, Ontario.
 Cathy McLeod b. 1957 first elected in 2008 as Conservative member for Kamloops—Thompson—Cariboo, Alberta. 
 Ezekiel McLeod b. 1840 first elected in 1891 as Conservative member for City of St. John, New Brunswick.
 George McLeod b. 1836 first elected in 1874 as Independent member for Kent, New Brunswick.
 George William McLeod b. 1896   first elected in 1953 as Social Credit member for Okanagan—Revelstoke, British Columbia.
 Harry Fulton McLeod b. 1871 first elected in 1913 as Conservative member for York, New Brunswick.
 Hugh McLeod b. 1843 first elected in 1878 as Liberal-Conservative member for Cape Breton, Nova Scotia.
 Michael McLeod b. 1959 first elected in 2015 as Liberal member for Northwest Territories. 
 William Mackenzie McLeod b. 1854 first elected in 1879 as Liberal-Conservative member for Cape Breton, Nova Scotia.
 Winfield Chester Scott McLure b. 1875   first elected in 1930 as Conservative member for Queen's, Prince Edward Island.
 John McMartin b. 1870 first elected in 1917 as Unionist member for Glengarry and Stormont, Ontario.
 Andrew Ross McMaster b. 1876   first elected in 1917 as Laurier Liberal member for Brome, Quebec.
 William Alexander McMaster b. 1879   first elected in 1945 as Progressive Conservative member for High Park, Ontario.
 Donald McMillan b. 1807 first elected in 1867 as Conservative member for Vaudreuil, Quebec.
 Hugh McMillan b. 1839 first elected in 1882 as Conservative member for Vaudreuil, Quebec.
 John McMillan b. 1823 first elected in 1882 as Liberal member for Huron South, Ontario.
 John McMillan b. 1816 first elected in 1867 as Liberal member for Restigouche, New Brunswick.
 John Angus McMillan b. 1874 first elected in 1908 as Liberal member for Glengarry, Ontario.
 Thomas McMillan b. 1864 first elected in 1925 as Liberal member for Huron South, Ontario.
 Thomas McMillan b. 1945   first elected in 1979 as Progressive Conservative member for Hillsborough, Prince Edward Island.
 William Hector McMillan b. 1892   first elected in 1950 as Liberal member for Welland, Ontario.
 John Ernest McMillin b. 1884   first elected in 1949 as Progressive Conservative member for Greenwood, Ontario.
 James McMonies b. 1800 first elected in 1867 as Liberal member for Wentworth North, Ontario.
 James McMullen b. 1833 first elected in 1882 as Liberal member for Wellington North, Ontario.
 Edward James McMurray b. 1878   first elected in 1921 as Liberal member for Winnipeg North, Manitoba.
 Archibald McNab b. 1826 first elected in 1875 as Liberal member for Glengarry, Ontario.
 Grant McNally b. 1962   first elected in 1997 as Reform member for Dewdney—Alouette, British Columbia.
 Alexander McNeill b. 1842 first elected in 1882 as Liberal-Conservative member for Bruce North, Ontario.
 Thomas Bruce McNevin b. 1884   first elected in 1935 as Liberal member for Victoria, Ontario.
 Donald Alexander McNiven b. 1887   first elected in 1935 as Liberal member for Regina City, Saskatchewan.
 James McNulty b. 1918   first elected in 1962 as Liberal member for Lincoln, Ontario.
 George Washington McPhee b. 1880   first elected in 1925 as Liberal member for Yorkton, Saskatchewan.
 Ewan McPherson b. 1878   first elected in 1926 as Liberal member for Portage la Prairie, Manitoba.
 Heather McPherson b. 1972 first elected in 2019 as New Democratic Party member for Edmonton Strathcona, Alberta.
 Albert DeBurgo McPhillips b. 1904   first elected in 1957 as Progressive Conservative member for Victoria, British Columbia.
 Arthur McQuade b. 1817 first elected in 1874 as Conservative member for Victoria South, Ontario.
 Melvin James McQuaid b. 1911   first elected in 1965 as Progressive Conservative member for King's, Prince Edward Island.
 William Garland McQuarrie b. 1876   first elected in 1917 as Unionist member for New Westminster, British Columbia.
 Henry Carwithen McQuillan b. 1906   first elected in 1958 as Progressive Conservative member for Comox—Alberni, British Columbia.
 Alexander Duncan McRae b. 1874 first elected in 1926 as Conservative member for Vancouver North, British Columbia.
 Paul Edmund McRae b. 1924   first elected in 1972 as Liberal member for Fort William, Ontario.
 John McRory b. 1834 first elected in 1878 as Conservative member for Addington, Ontario.
 James McShane b. 1833 first elected in 1895 as Liberal member for Montreal Centre, Quebec.
 Neil Haman McTaggart b. 1882   first elected in 1921 as Progressive member for Maple Creek, Saskatchewan.
 Dan McTeague b. 1962   first elected in 1993 as Liberal member for Ontario, Ontario.
 Edward Watson McWhinney b. 1924   first elected in 1993 as Liberal member for Vancouver Quadra, British Columbia.
 George Roy McWilliam b. 1905   first elected in 1949 as Liberal member for Northumberland, New Brunswick.

Me 

 Howie Meeker b. 1923   first elected in 1951 as Progressive Conservative member for Waterloo South, Ontario.
 Arthur Meighen b. 1874 first elected in 1908 as Conservative member for Portage la Prairie, Manitoba.
 Daniel Bishop Meigs b. 1835 first elected in 1888 as Liberal member for Missisquoi, Quebec.
 Eric Melillo b. 1998 first elected in 2019 as Conservative member for Kenora, Ontario. 
 J.-Armand Ménard b. 1905   first elected in 1955 as Liberal member for Saint-Jean—Iberville—Napierville, Quebec.
 Réal Ménard b. 1962   first elected in 1993 as Bloc Québécois member for Hochelaga—Maisonneuve, Quebec.
 Serge Ménard b. 1941   first elected in 2004 as Bloc Québécois member for Marc-Aurèle-Fortin, Quebec.
 Lewis Menary b. 1882   first elected in 1945 as Progressive Conservative member for Wellington North, Ontario.
 Alexandra Mendès b. 1963 first elected in 2008 as Liberal member for Brossard—La Prairie, Quebec.
 Marco Mendicino b. 1973 first elected in 2015 as Liberal member for Eglinton—Lawrence, Ontario.
 Costas Menegakis b. 1959 first elected in 2011 as Conservative member for Richmond Hill, Ontario. 
 Ted Menzies b. 1952   first elected in 2004 as Conservative member for Macleod, Alberta.
 Gary Merasty b. 1964 first elected in 2006 as Liberal member for Desnethé—Missinippi—Churchill River, Saskatchewan.
 Honoré Mercier b. 1840 first elected in 1872 as Liberal member for Rouville, Quebec.
 Joseph-Alexandre Mercier b. 1874 first elected in 1925 as Liberal member for Laurier—Outremont, Quebec.
 Paul Mercier b. 1924   first elected in 1993 as Bloc Québécois member for Blainville—Deux-Montagnes, Quebec.
 Paul Mercier b. 1888   first elected in 1921 as Liberal member for Westmount—St. Henri, Quebec.
 Val Meredith b. 1949   first elected in 1993 as Reform member for Surrey—White Rock—South Langley, British Columbia.
 Jonathan Joseph Merner b. 1864 first elected in 1911 as Conservative member for Huron South, Ontario.
 Samuel Merner b. 1823 first elected in 1878 as Conservative member for Waterloo South, Ontario.
 Rob Merrifield b. 1953   first elected in 2000 as Canadian Alliance member for Yellowhead, Alberta.
 Gerald Merrithew b. 1931   first elected in 1984 as Progressive Conservative member for Saint John, New Brunswick.
 Charles Cecil Ingersoll Merritt b. 1908   first elected in 1945 as Progressive Conservative member for Vancouver—Burrard, British Columbia.
 Thomas Rodman Merritt b. 1824 first elected in 1868 as Liberal member for Lincoln, Ontario.
 John Albert Messervy b. 1861 first elected in 1925 as Conservative member for Queen's, Prince Edward Island.
 James Metcalfe b. 1822 first elected in 1867 as Liberal member for York East, Ontario.
 James Henry Metcalfe b. 1848 first elected in 1892 as Conservative member for Kingston, Ontario.
 François Xavier Ovide Méthot b. 1843 first elected in 1877 as Independent Conservative member for Nicolet, Quebec.
 Adrien Meunier b. 1905   first elected in 1953 as Independent Liberal member for Papineau, Quebec.
 Sydney Chilton Mewburn b. 1863 first elected in 1917 as Unionist member for Hamilton East, Ontario.

Mi 
 Wilson Miao first elected in 2021 as Liberal member Richmond Centre, British Columbia. 
 Benoît Michaud b. 1902   first elected in 1945 as Liberal member for Restigouche—Madawaska, New Brunswick.
Élaine Michaud b. 1985 first elected in 2011 as New Democratic Party member for Portneuf—Jacques-Cartier, Quebec.
 Hervé J. Michaud b. 1912   first elected in 1953 as Liberal member for Kent, New Brunswick.
 Joseph Enoil Michaud b. 1888   first elected in 1933 as Liberal member for Restigouche—Madawaska, New Brunswick.
 Kristina Michaud first elected in 2019 as Bloc Québécois member for Avignon—La Mitis—Matane—Matapédia, Quebec.
 Pius Michaud b. 1870 first elected in 1907 as Liberal member for Victoria, New Brunswick.
 Roland Michener b. 1900   first elected in 1953 as Progressive Conservative member for St. Paul's, Ontario.
 William Sora Middlebro b. 1868 first elected in 1908 as Conservative member for Grey North, Ontario.
 Fred Mifflin b. 1938   first elected in 1988 as Liberal member for Bonavista—Trinity—Conception, Newfoundland and Labrador.
 Roch Moïse Samuel Mignault b. 1837 first elected in 1891 as Liberal member for Yamaska, Quebec.
 MaryAnn Mihychuk b. 1955 first elected in 2015 as Liberal member for Kildonan—St. Paul, Manitoba.
 Campbell Ewing Millar b. 1911   first elected in 1962 as Progressive Conservative member for Middlesex East, Ontario.
 John Millar b. 1866 first elected in 1921 as Progressive member for Qu'Appelle, Saskatchewan.
 Archibald Campbell Miller b. 1836 first elected in 1891 as Conservative member for Prince Edward, Ontario.
 Calvert Charlton Miller b. 1899   first elected in 1946 as Progressive Conservative member for Portage la Prairie, Manitoba.
 Edward Allan Miller b. 1942   first elected in 1979 as New Democratic Party member for Nanaimo—Alberni, British Columbia.
 Henry Horton Miller b. 1861 first elected in 1904 as Liberal member for Grey South, Ontario.
 Larry Miller b. 1956   first elected in 2004 as Conservative member for Grey—Bruce—Owen Sound, Ontario.
 Marc Miller b. 1973 first elected in 2015 as Liberal member for Ville-Marie—Le Sud-Ouest—Île-des-Sœurs, Quebec.
 Clarence Adam Milligan b. 1904   first elected in 1957 as Progressive Conservative member for Prince Edward—Lennox, Ontario.
 Peter Milliken b. 1946   first elected in 1988 as Liberal member for Kingston and the Islands, Ontario.
 David Mills b. 1831 first elected in 1867 as Liberal member for Bothwell, Ontario.
 Dennis Mills b. 1946   first elected in 1988 as Liberal member for Broadview—Greenwood, Ontario.
 John Burpee Mills b. 1850 first elected in 1887 as Conservative member for Annapolis, Nova Scotia.
 Robert Mills b. 1941   first elected in 1993 as Reform member for Red Deer, Alberta.
 Wilson Henry Mills b. 1882   first elected in 1934 as Liberal member for Elgin West, Ontario.
 Robert Milne b. 1881   first elected in 1921 as Progressive member for Neepawa, Manitoba.
 William Ross Milne b. 1932   first elected in 1974 as Liberal member for Peel—Dufferin—Simcoe, Ontario.
 Clement George Minaker b. 1937   first elected in 1984 as Progressive Conservative member for Winnipeg—St. James, Manitoba.
 Maria Minna b. 1948   first elected in 1993 as Liberal member for Beaches—Woodbine, Ontario.
 Andrew Mitchell b. 1953   first elected in 1993 as Liberal member for Parry Sound—Muskoka, Ontario.
 Archibald Hugh Mitchell b. 1903   first elected in 1935 as Social Credit member for Medicine Hat, Alberta.
 Rodger Mitchell b. 1898   first elected in 1953 as Liberal member for Sudbury, Ontario.
 Humphrey Mitchell b. 1894   first elected in 1931 as Labour member for Hamilton East, Ontario.
 Margaret Anne Mitchell b. 1925   first elected in 1979 as New Democratic Party member for Vancouver East, British Columbia.
 Peter Mitchell b. 1824 first elected in 1872 as Independent member for Northumberland, New Brunswick.
 Robert Weld Mitchell b. 1915   first elected in 1953 as Progressive Conservative member for London, Ontario.
 Walter George Mitchell b. 1877   first elected in 1921 as Liberal member for St. Antoine, Quebec.
 Constantine George Mitges b. 1919   first elected in 1972 as Progressive Conservative member for Grey—Simcoe, Ontario.

Mo 

 George Moffat b. 1810 first elected in 1870 as Conservative member for Restigouche, New Brunswick.
 George Moffat b. 1842 first elected in 1887 as Conservative member for Restigouche, New Brunswick.
 Robert Moffat b. 1844 first elected in 1882 as Conservative member for Restigouche, New Brunswick.
 John Patrick Molloy b. 1873 first elected in 1908 as Liberal member for Provencher, Manitoba.
 George Moncrieff b. 1842 first elected in 1887 as Conservative member for Lambton East, Ontario.
 Albéric Archie Mondou b. 1872 first elected in 1911 as Conservative member for Yamaska, Quebec.
 Dominique Monet b. 1865 first elected in 1891 as Liberal member for Napierville, Quebec.
 Marcel Monette b. 1895   first elected in 1949 as Liberal member for Mercier, Quebec.
 Jean-Baptiste Mongenais b. 1803 first elected in 1878 as Conservative member for Vaudreuil, Quebec.
 Joseph-Alfred Mongrain b. 1908   first elected in 1965 as Independent member for Trois-Rivières, Quebec.
 Frederick Debartzch Monk b. 1856 first elected in 1896 as Conservative member for Jacques Cartier, Quebec.
 Maryam Monsef b. 1984 first elected in 2015 as Liberal member for Peterborough—Kawartha, Ontario.
 Walter Humphries Montague b. 1858 first elected in 1887 as Conservative member for Haldimand, Ontario.
 Andrew Monteith b. 1823 first elected in 1874 as Conservative member for Perth North, Ontario.
 Harold Edmond Monteith b. 1900 first elected in 1958 as Progressive Conservative member for Verdun, Quebec.
 Jay Waldo Monteith b. 1903   first elected in 1953 as Progressive Conservative member for Perth, Ontario.
 Ken Monteith b. 1938 first elected in 1988 as Progressive Conservative member for Elgin, Ontario.
 Gage Workman Montgomery b. 1898 first elected in 1952 as Progressive Conservative member for Victoria—Carleton, New Brunswick.
 Hippolyte Montplaisir b. 1839 first elected in 1874 as Liberal-Conservative member for Champlain, Quebec.
 Alvin Head Moore b. 1838 first elected in 1896 as Conservative member for Stanstead, Quebec.
 Barry D. Moore b. 1944   first elected in 1984 as Progressive Conservative member for Pontiac—Gatineau—Labelle, Quebec.
 Christine Moore b. 1983 first elected in 2011 as New Democratic Party member for Abitibi—Témiscamingue, Quebec.
 Harry Andrew Moore b. 1914   first elected in 1962 as Progressive Conservative member for Wetaskiwin, Alberta.
 James Moore b. 1976 first elected in 2000 as Canadian Alliance member for Port Moody—Coquitlam—Port Coquitlam, British Columbia.
 John Clarke Moore b. 1871 first elected in 1930 as Conservative member for Châteauguay—Huntingdon, Quebec.
 Rob Moore b. 1974 first elected in 2004 as Conservative member for Fundy, New Brunswick.
 Ronald Stewart Moore b. 1913   first elected in 1945 as Cooperative Commonwealth Federation member for Churchill, Manitoba.
 William Henry Moore b. 1872 first elected in 1930 as Liberal member for Ontario, Ontario.
 Frank Duff Moores b. 1933   first elected in 1968 as Progressive Conservative member for Bonavista—Trinity—Conception, Newfoundland and Labrador.
 Raymond Ducharme Morand b. 1887   first elected in 1925 as Conservative member for Essex East, Ontario.
 Marty Morantz b. 1962 first elected in 2019 as Conservative member for Charleswood—St. James—Assiniboia—Headingley, Manitoba. 
 Kenneth Hamill More b. 1907   first elected in 1958 as Progressive Conservative member for Regina City, Saskatchewan.
 Maurice John Moreau b. 1927   first elected in 1963 as Liberal member for York—Scarborough, Ontario.
 J. Trevor Morgan b. 1923   first elected in 1972 as Progressive Conservative member for St. Catharines, Ontario.
 Albanie Morin b. 1921   first elected in 1972 as Liberal member for Louis-Hébert, Quebec.
 Dany Morin b. 1985 first elected in 2011 as New Democratic Party member for Chicoutimi—Le Fjord, Quebec. 
 Georges Dorèze Morin b. 1884   first elected in 1925 as Liberal member for Bagot, Quebec.
 Isabelle Morin b. 1985 first elected in 2011 as New Democratic Party member for Notre-Dame-de-Grâce—Lachine, Quebec.
 Jean-Baptiste Morin b. 1840 first elected in 1896 as Conservative member for Dorchester, Quebec.
 Louis-Simon-René Morin b. 1883   first elected in 1921 as Liberal member for St. Hyacinthe—Rouville, Quebec.
 Marc-André Morin b. 1951 first elected in 2011 as New Democratic Party member for Laurentides—Labelle, Quebec.
 Marie-Claude Morin b. 1985 first elected in 2011 as New Democratic Party member for Saint-Hyacinthe—Bagot, Quebec. 
 John Morison b. 1818 first elected in 1867 as Liberal member for Victoria North, Ontario.
 John B. Morison b. 1923   first elected in 1963 as Liberal member for Wentworth, Ontario.
 Émilien Morissette b. 1927   first elected in 1958 as Progressive Conservative member for Rimouski, Quebec.
 Bill Morneau b. 1962 first elected in 2015 as Liberal member for Toronto Centre, Ontario.
 Hugh Boulton Morphy b. 1860 first elected in 1911 as Conservative member for Perth North, Ontario.
 Mike Morrice b. 1984 first elected in 2021 as Green member for Kitchener Centre, Ontario. 
 Alexander Morris b. 1826 first elected in 1867 as Conservative member for Lanark South, Ontario.
 Edmund Leverett Morris b. 1923   first elected in 1957 as Progressive Conservative member for Halifax, Nova Scotia.
 James Morris b. 1857 first elected in 1913 as Conservative member for Châteauguay, Quebec.
 Alexander Morrison b. 1851 first elected in 1912 as Conservative member for Macdonald, Manitoba.
 Angus Morrison b. 1822 first elected in 1867 as Conservative member for Niagara, Ontario.
 Aulay MacAulay Morrison b. 1863 first elected in 1896 as Liberal member for New Westminster, British Columbia.
 John Morrison b. 1872 first elected in 1921 as Progressive member for Weyburn, Saskatchewan.
 Lee Glen Morrison b. 1932   first elected in 1993 as Reform member for Swift Current—Maple Creek—Assiniboia, Saskatchewan.
 Rob Morrison b. 1956 first elected in 2019 as Conservative member for Kootenay—Columbia, British Columbia.
 Bobby Morrissey b. 1954 first elected in 2015 as Liberal member for Egmont, Prince Edward Island. 
 Charles Joseph Morrissy b. 1881   first elected in 1926 as Liberal member for Northumberland, New Brunswick.
 John Morrissy b. 1857 first elected in 1921 as Liberal member for Northumberland, New Brunswick.
 Murray Douglas Morton b. 1916   first elected in 1957 as Progressive Conservative member for Davenport, Ontario.
 Thomas Moss b. 1836 first elected in 1873 as Liberal member for West Toronto, Ontario.
 William Richard Motherwell b. 1860 first elected in 1921 as Liberal member for Regina, Saskatchewan.
 William Malcolm Mott b. 1894   first elected in 1949 as Liberal member for New Westminster, British Columbia.
 Glen Motz b. 1958 first elected in 2016 as Conservative member for Medicine Hat—Cardston—Warner, Alberta.
 Maria Mourani b. 1969 first elected in 2006 as Bloc Québécois member for Ahuntsic, Quebec. 
 Joseph Alfred Mousseau b. 1838 first elected in 1874 as Conservative member for Bagot, Quebec.
 Joseph Octave Mousseau b. 1844 first elected in 1891 as Independent member for Soulanges, Quebec.
 Herbert Macdonald Mowat b. 1863 first elected in 1917 as Unionist member for Parkdale, Ontario.

Mu 

  George Robson Muir b. 1903   first elected in 1957 as Progressive Conservative member for Lisgar, Manitoba.
 Robert Muir b. 1919   first elected in 1957 as Progressive Conservative member for Cape Breton North and Victoria, Nova Scotia.
 Mark Muise b. 1957   first elected in 1997 as Progressive Conservative member for West Nova, Nova Scotia.
 Tom Mulcair b. 1954 first elected in 2007 as New Democratic Party member for Outremont, Quebec. 
 John Cooney Mullally b. 1930   first elected in 1963 as Liberal member for King's, Prince Edward Island.
 Henry Alfred Mullins b. 1861 first elected in 1925 as Conservative member for Marquette, Manitoba.
 James Patrick Mullins b. 1874 first elected in 1935 as Liberal member for Richmond—Wolfe, Quebec.
 William Mulock b. 1844 first elected in 1882 as Liberal member for York North, Ontario.
 William Pate Mulock b. 1897   first elected in 1934 as Liberal member for York North, Ontario.
 Martin Brian Mulroney b. 1939   first elected in 1983 as Progressive Conservative member for Central Nova, Nova Scotia.
 Albert Edward Munn b. 1865 first elected in 1930 as Liberal member for Vancouver North, British Columbia.
 Donald W. Munro b. 1916   first elected in 1972 as Progressive Conservative member for Esquimalt—Saanich, British Columbia.
 Elgin Albert Munro b. 1874 first elected in 1921 as Liberal member for Fraser Valley, British Columbia.
 John C. Munro b. 1931   first elected in 1962 as Liberal member for Hamilton East, Ontario.
 John H. Munroe b. 1820 first elected in 1867 as Conservative member for Elgin West, Ontario.
 Charles Arthur Munson b. 1857 first elected in 1911 as Conservative member for Northumberland West, Ontario.
 James Murdock b. 1871 first elected in 1922 as Liberal member for Kent, Ontario.
 Brian Murphy first elected in 2006 as Liberal member for Moncton—Riverview—Dieppe
 Charles Murphy b. 1862 first elected in 1908 as Liberal member for Russell, Ontario.
 Terrence Murphy b. 1926   first elected in 1968 as Liberal member for Sault Ste. Marie, Ontario.
 Henry Joseph Murphy b. 1921   first elected in 1953 as Liberal member for Westmorland, New Brunswick.
 John Murphy b. 1937   first elected in 1993 as Liberal member for Annapolis Valley—Hants, Nova Scotia.
 Joseph Warner Murphy b. 1892   first elected in 1945 as Progressive Conservative member for Lambton West, Ontario.
 Rodney Edward Murphy b. 1946   first elected in 1979 as New Democratic Party member for Churchill, Manitoba.
 Shawn Murphy b. 1951   first elected in 2000 as Liberal member for Hillsborough, Prince Edward Island.
 Thomas Gerow Murphy b. 1883   first elected in 1925 as Conservative member for Neepawa, Manitoba.
 William Samuel Murphy b. 1882   first elected in 1929 as Independent Conservative member for Lanark, Ontario.
 Alexander Clark Murray b. 1900   first elected in 1949 as Liberal member for Oxford, Ontario.
 George Matheson Murray b. 1889   first elected in 1949 as Liberal member for Cariboo, British Columbia.
 Ian Murray b. 1951   first elected in 1993 as Liberal member for Lanark—Carleton, Ontario.
Joyce Murray b. 1954 first elected in 2008 as Liberal member for Vancouver Quadra, British Columbia. 
 Thomas Murray b. 1836 first elected in 1891 as Liberal member for Pontiac, Quebec.
 William Murray b. 1839 first elected in 1874 as Liberal member for Renfrew North, Ontario.
 Jack Murta b. 1943   first elected in 1970 as Progressive Conservative member for Lisgar, Manitoba.
 Leslie Alexander Mutch b. 1897   first elected in 1935 as Liberal member for Winnipeg South, Manitoba.
 Ephraim Bell Muttart b. 1839 first elected in 1878 as Conservative member for King's County, Prince Edward Island.
 Dan Muys b. 1970 first elected as Conservative member for Flamborough—Glanbrook, Ontario.

My 

 Edward Thomas Wordon Myers b. 1879   first elected in 1917 as Unionist member for Kindersley, Saskatchewan.
 John Howard Myers b. 1880   first elected in 1930 as Conservative member for Queen's, Prince Edward Island.
 Lynn Myers b. 1951   first elected in 1997 as Liberal member for Waterloo—Wellington, Ontario.

M